Ruta is a dispersed settlement in the Pohorje Hills above the right bank of the Drava River in the Municipality of Lovrenc na Pohorju in northeastern Slovenia. The area is part of the traditional region of Styria. It is now included in the Drava Statistical Region.

Notable people 

 Tatjana Bregant - prehistoric archaeologist

References

External links

Ruta on Geopedia

Populated places in the Municipality of Lovrenc na Pohorju